Christopher Gerald McClellan Bart-Williams (born 16 June 1974) is an English football coach and former professional footballer. 

As a player, he was a defender and midfielder and notably played in the Premier League for Sheffield Wednesday, Nottingham Forest and Charlton Athletic. He also played in the Football League for Leyton Orient and Ipswich Town, in Cyprus with APOEL and in Malta with Marsaxlokk. He was capped by England at youth level and went on to play for England under-21s and was called up to train with the senior squad although he never won a full England cap.

Following retirement, Bart-Williams has moved into coaching in the United States and has notably worked as assistant coach of Women's Premier Soccer League side SoccerPlus Connecticut.

Early life
Born in Freetown, Sierra Leone, Bart-Williams grew up in North London and attended The School of St. David's and St Katharine's in Hornsey. He represented  his school, borough (Haringey), county (Middlesex).

Playing career
When he was just 16 years old, Bart-Williams launched his professional career with Leyton Orient. He made 36 appearances with the club and scored twice.

Sheffield Wednesday showed interest in him and subsequently bought him for the record sum of £275,000 in 1991, the year they won promotion to the Football League First Division and were also winners of the Football League Cup.

Once with Sheffield Wednesday, Bart-Williams got a place in the first team immediately despite his young age. He began his career playing as an attacking midfielder. On 12 April 1993, he scored a hat-trick against Southampton in a 5–2 win.

Bart-Williams played for Wednesday as a substitute in the 1993 FA Cup Final replacing Chris Waddle in the first game and Roland Nilsson towards the end of the replay.

He also helped the Owls reach the Football League Cup semi-finals in the 1993–94 season and also appeared in their short-lived UEFA Cup campaign (the club's first European run since the 1960s) the previous season.

After four years, he moved to Nottingham Forest for the sum of £2.5 million. Bart-Williams had a successful spell with Forest, and even though he played as a defensive midfielder he managed to score 35 goals, even being the club's top scorer in the 2000–2001 season, and was often clinical from free kicks and penalties.

During a game in 2000, Forest tried to experiment with their formation by playing 3–5–2 and played Bart-Williams as a sweeper. This experiment turned out to be a successful one as Nottingham Forest won 5–0 against Burnley, with Bart-Williams scoring twice.

In 2001, Forest found themselves in financial difficulties and had to sell their better players. Bart-Williams turned down moves to Southampton and Birmingham City

In December 2001, Bart-Williams left Forest, signing for Charlton Athletic, initially on a short-term contract. In May 2002 he signed a new two-year deal at the club. Bart-Williams had 20 appearances and two goals.

After spending two seasons with Charlton, Bart-Williams moved to Ipswich Town, initially on loan in September 2003, and then permanently for the rest of the 2003–04 season. He was released the end of the season and decided to move away from English football.

Next for Bart-Williams was a move to APOEL in Cyprus in September 2004. He had been linked with a return to Nottingham Forest, although the rumour was denied by Forest.

After unsuccessful attempts to lure Paul Gascoigne to the club, on 6 August 2005 Maltese team Marsaxlokk signed Bart-Williams. But he managed only eight appearances and was sent home only two months into his three-year contract.

Coaching career
After retiring from professional play, Bart-Williams moved to the United States to coach alongside former U.S. Women's National Team head coach Tony DiCicco. He served as an assistant for the Boston Breakers, a team in the WPSL. He also was head coach of their reserve squads under the SoccerPlus Connecticut club. Bart-Williams joined the Quinnipiac University men's soccer program as an assistant coach, helping to lead them to a 2013 MAAC Conference championship and the first round of the NCAA tournament. He also served as an assistant coach for the Quinnipiac University men's soccer team for six years.

Bart-Williams now runs an international soccer training and college recruiting service, CBW Soccer Elite, placing talented student-athletes in American college soccer programs. Bart-Williams is also a consultant to  Charlotte Soccer Academy's U.S. Soccer Development Academy program and is the head of Gulliver Schools'  boys' soccer program in Miami, Florida.

Career statistics
Source:

Honours
Sheffield Wednesday
Football League Cup runner-up: 1992–93
FA Cup runner-up: 1992–93

Nottingham Forest
Football League First Division: 1997–98

England U19
FIFA World Youth Championship Third place: 1993

Individual
Nottingham Forest Player of the Year: 2000–01
PFA First Division Fans' Player of the Year: 2001

References

External links
Chris Bart-Williams at Marsaxlokkfc.com

CBW Soccer Elite

1974 births
Living people
Footballers from Hornsey
English footballers
England youth international footballers
England under-21 international footballers
England B international footballers
Association football defenders
Association football midfielders
Association football utility players
Leyton Orient F.C. players
Sheffield Wednesday F.C. players
Nottingham Forest F.C. players
Charlton Athletic F.C. players
Ipswich Town F.C. players
APOEL FC players
Marsaxlokk F.C. players
English Football League players
Premier League players
Cypriot First Division players
Expatriate footballers in Cyprus
Expatriate footballers in Malta
Expatriate soccer players in the United States
English expatriate footballers
Sierra Leone Creole people
Sierra Leonean emigrants to the United Kingdom
FA Cup Final players
Association football coaches